Psilocybe aquamarina is a species of mushroom-forming fungus in the family Hymenogastraceae. First described as a species of Stropharia by David Pegler in 1977, it was transferred to the genus Psilocybe by Gastón Guzmán in 1995.

See also
List of psilocybin mushrooms
Psilocybin mushrooms

References

Entheogens
Fungi described in 1977
Psychoactive fungi
aquamarina
Psychedelic tryptamine carriers
Fungi of North America